Peronospora dianthi is a plant pathogen for which the binomial authority is Heinrich Anton de Bary.

References 

Water mould plant pathogens and diseases
Peronosporales